Better Homes and Gardens may refer to:

 Better Homes and Gardens (magazine), an American magazine
 Better Homes and Gardens (TV program), an Australian television series
Better Homes and Gardens Real Estate, an international real estate brokerage business

See also
 Home & Garden (disambiguation)
 BHG (disambiguation)